Nové Mesto (Slovak for "New Town") may refer to:

abbreviation of Nové Mesto nad Váhom, a town in Slovakia
abbreviation of Nové Mesto pod Šiatrom (Sátoraljaújhely), a town in Hungary
abbreviation of Kysucké Nové Mesto, a town in Slovakia
Nové Mesto, Bratislava, a city part of Bratislava
Nové Mesto, Košice, a city part of Košice
Nové Mesto, Poprad, a city part of Poprad
Nové Mesto, Trnava, a city part of Trnava

See also
Nové Město (disambiguation)
Novo Mesto